Frigyes Hidas (25 May 1928 – 7 March 2007) was a Hungarian composer.

Hidas was born and died in Budapest, where he studied composition at the Franz Liszt Academy of Music with János Visky. After his studies, he was the musical director of the National Theater in Budapest from 1951 to 1966 and also held the same role at the city's Operetta Theater from 1974 to 1979.

Following this, Hidas was a freelance composer. His oeuvre covered almost every genre, including operas, ballets, concertos, other orchestral works, chamber music, and vocal and choral music. He was one of the foremost names in the world of contemporary chamber and concert band music for wind instruments. In addition, he enjoyed various commissions from opera houses, radio stations, universities, ballet companies, and musical association and federations. He received many prizes and other forms of recognition for his musical services.

Partial list of works

Concerto per oboe e orchestra (1951) concerto
1. VONÓSNÉGYES (1954) chamber music
SONATA for oboe and piano (1955) chamber music
Trumpet Concerto No. 1 (1956) concerto
SONATA for organ (1956) solo
Missa brevis (1956) choir and solo instrument(s)
Violin Concerto No. 1 (1957) concerto
Concerto No. 1 for clarinet and orchestra (1958) concerto
Concerto for viola and orchestra (1959) concerto
Cantate de minoribus (1959) choir and orchestra
SYMPHONY (1960) symphonic work
Színek (1960) stage play
1. FÚVÓSKVINTETT (1961) chamber music
2. VONÓSNÉGYES (1963) chamber music
FANTASIA for clarinet and piano (1965) chamber music
Asszony és az igazság, Az (1965) stage play
Concertino for string orchestra (1966) string orchestra
Concerto for flute and orchestra (1967) concerto
Hajnaltól estig (1967) choir and orchestra
Concerto per corno e orchestra (1968) concerto
2. FÚVÓSKVINTETT - LO SVAGO (1969) chamber music
Concertino for four flutes, four clarinets and string orchestra (1969) symphonic work
FANTASIA for organ (1969) solo
QUINTETTO D´OTTONI (1972) chamber music
Brass Sextet (1972) chamber music
Concerto for piano and orchestra (1972) concerto
Little Brass Quintet (1973) chamber music
Gyászzene - Requiem egy hadseregért (1973) solo voice(s), choir and orchestra
Chamber Music (1974) chamber music
Cédrus (1975) stage play
INTERLUDIO (1977) for three trombones
INTRODUZIONE E FUGHETTA (1977) chamber music
SCHERZO E CORALE (1977) chamber music
Adagio (1977) symphonic work
Concerto Semplice per clarinetto e orchestra (1977) concerto
FANTASIA for trombone (1977) solo
Bösendorfer (1977) stage play
Five Movements (1978) chamber music
Capriccio (1979) brass band
Seven Bagatelles (1979) chamber orchestra
3. FÚVÓSKVINTETT (1979) chamber music
Concerto per trombone e orchestra (1979) concerto
Concerto per arpa e orchestra (1979) concerto
MEDITATION for bass trombone (1979) solo
Ballet Music (1980) brass band
VIDÁM ZENE (1980) brass band
Six Studies (1980) chamber music
TRIO (1980) chamber music
Concerto for Bassoon and String Orchestra (1980) concerto
Concertino for wind symphony orchestra (1981) brass band
SUITE for wind symphony orchestra (1981) brass band
PLAY (1981) chamber music
Rhapsody (1982) concerto
MOVEMENT (1982) chamber music
Septett (1982) chamber music
THREE LITTLE SCHERZOS (1982) chamber music
Edzésminták - 16 rézfúvós szextett (1982) chamber music
EDZÉSMINTÁK - 24 rézfúvós kvintett (1982) chamber music
BALATONI NÉPDALOK (1982) chamber music
KILENC BÉKÉS-MEGYEI NÉPDAL (1982) chamber music
THREE SKETCHES (1982) chamber music
Ballad for violoncello and orchestra (1982) concerto
Cymboa for cimbalom, oboe and string orchestra (1982) concerto
Concerto No. 2 (Ohio Concerto) for flute and wind ensemble (1983) concerto
5 X 5 (1983) chamber music
Academic Quintet (1983) chamber music
Little Suite (1983) chamber music
Music for Brass (1983) chamber orchestra
Trumpet Fantasy for trumpet and piano (1983) chamber music
Concerto Barocco for alto trombone and string orchestra (1983) concerto
Concerto No. 2 for trombone and orchestra (1983) concerto
Trumpet Fantasy for trumpet and orchestra (1983) concerto
Fantasy for Twelve Horns (1983) chamber orchestra
Repülős induló (1984) brass band
FANTASY AND FUGUE (1984) brass band
NEUHOFEN SIGNAL (1984) brass band
NEUHOFEN SUITE (1984) brass band
Széchenyi-concerto (1984) symphonic work
Preludium, Passacaglia and Fugue (1984) concerto
Dunakanyar (1984) stage play
ÜNNEPI ZENE (1985) brass band
Circus Suite (1985) brass band
1. NÉPDALSZVIT (1985) brass band
2. NÉPDALSZVIT (1985) brass band
HELYŐRSÉGI INDULÓ (1985) brass band
NÉGYESFOGAT (1985) chamber music
Divertimento (1985) chamber music
MAGYAR NÉPDALOK (1985) chamber music
Musique pour six (1985) chamber music
PIAN-ORG (1985) chamber music
Quintetto Concertante (1986) concerto
ALTEBA TRIO (1986) chamber music
Five Miniatures (1986) chamber music
3. VONÓSNÉGYES (1986) chamber music
THREE MOVEMENTS FOR ORCHESTRA (1987) symphonic work
ETUDE (1988) brass band
Double Concerto for tenor and bass trombone and symphony orchestra (1988) concerto
REGES THARSIS (1988) choir and solo instrument(s)
1+5 (1989) bass trombone and wind quintet
ONLY TWO (1989) chamber music
EL NEM TÁNCOLT BALETT, AZ szimfonikus zenekarra (1989) symphonic work
Concerto No. 2 for horn and string orchestra (1989) concerto
Double Concerto for horn, harp and string orchestra with percussion (1989) concerto
PSALMUS CL (1989) choir and solo instrument(s)
VÁLTOZÓ RITMUSOK (1990) brass band
Little Fanfare (1990) chamber orchestra
Tuba Quartet (1990) chamber music
FOUR LITTLE PIECES (1990) chamber music
SAXOPHONE QUARTET (1990) chamber music
FOUR MOVEMENTS FOR BRASS ENSEMBLE (1991) brass band
Florida Concerto (1991) concerto
Baroque Concerto for alto trombone and organ (1991) chamber music
Domine, Dona Nobis Pacem (1991) chamber music
MESE (1991) chamber music
Episode (1991) concerto
Missa in honorem reginae pacis (1991) solo voice(s), choir and solo instrument(s)
ÁLMODJ BACHOT (1991) stage play
A Little Encore (1992) chamber music
TRIGA (1992) chamber music
Quintettinio No. 1 (1992) chamber music
QUINTETTINO NO. 2 (1992) chamber music
QUINTETTINO NO. 3 (1992) chamber music
Ballad for violoncello and piano (1992) chamber music
MUSIC FOR HARP AND VIOLIN (1992) chamber music
Köszöntő (1992) symphonic work
STRING FANTASY (1992) string orchestra
Brussels Concerto (1992) concerto
ALMOST B.A.C.H. (1993) brass band
ÜNNEPI INDULÓ (1993) brass band
MUSICA SOLENNE (1993) brass band
Tutti Frutti (1993) brass band
Suite for Strings (1993) chamber orchestra
188 bars for brass (1995) chamber orchestra
Septettino (1995) chamber music
Variable Spirits (1995) chamber music
Concerto per clavicembalo e piccola orchestra d´archi (1995) concerto
IV. Európai Ifjúsági Zenei Fesztivál záróhangjai, A (1995) choir and orchestra
REQUIEM (1995) solo voice(s), choir and orchestra
EUPHONIADA (1995) concerto
Sestettino (1995) chamber music
EL NEM TÁNCOLT BALETT, AZ brass band (1996) brass band
SPRIGHTLY TUNES (1996) brass band
Tuba Concerto (1996) concerto
1+4 (1996) chamber music
RITMUSJÁTÉK (1996) chamber music

Cancate de minorites for symphonic orchestra, man's choir, & narrator (1963) [25'; manuscript]
Signal for 4 trumpets & (5+4) trombones & tuba (1973) [4’; manuscript]
Fantasy for 12 horns (1978) [4'; ITC Marc Reift]
Fantasy for 12 Horns (1983) [4’; ITC Marc Reiff]
Ünnepi zene / Festive Music (1985) [8’; Johann Kliment Musikverlag]
Változó ritmusok / Changing Rhythms (1990) [3’; manuscript]
Saxophon Quartet (1990) [12'; Edition Darok]
Four Movements for brass ensemble (1991) [7’; manuscript]
Euphoiada concerto for euphonium & wind ensemble (1995) [10'; Johann Kliment Verlag]
188 Bars for Brass for 12 horns, 12 trumpets, 10 trombones, 2 tubas & percussion (1995) [9’; manuscript]
Septettino for 3 trumpets, 2 trombones & tuba (also in version for brass quintet) (1995) [3'; manuscript]
Sestettino for 3 trumpets, 2 trombones & tuba (1995) [3'; manuscript]
Trombone Quartet (1996) [8’; Musikverlag Bruno Uetz]
Sonata for oboe & piano (1995) [14'; Musikverlag Kartaus-Schmülling]
A IV. Európai Ifjúsági Fesztivál záró hangjai / Finale to the Fourth European Youth Music Festival for concert band & youth choir (1995) [4:30; FAM]
Requiem for soprano, alto, tenor, bass, concert band & mixed choir (1995); Stormworks Europe]
Ritmusjáték / Play of Rhythmanuscript for 4 clarinets (1996) [2’; BMC]
The Undanced Ballet version for wind band (1996) [18’; BMC]
Sprightly Tunes (1996) [8:30; BMC]
Tuba Concerto for tuba & wind orchestra (1996) [10’; BMC]
Trombone Quartet (also version for Tuba Quartet) (1996?) [8’; Musikverlag B. Uetz]
Scherzo for tuba & 4 horns (1996) [2:25; Musikverlag B. Uetz]
Save the Sea sinfonia for symphonic band (1997) [25:50; BMC]
Vonószene (1997) [3’; manuscript]
Tuphonium for 2 euphoniums & 2 tubas (1997?) [8’; BMC]
Five Little Movements for brass (1998) [9:30; BMC]
Concerto for symphonic band (1998) [19’; BMC]
Concerto for saxophone quartet & symphonic band (1998) [10’; BMC]
Vjenne (History of Vriezenveen) concerto for symphonic band (1998) [18:30; BMC]
Concerto for Oboe No. 2 for oboe & wind ensemble (1999) [15’; BMC]
Birthday Concerto for trombone & symphonic orchestra (1998) [13’; BMC]
Fantasy for violoncello solo & wind ensemble (1998) [15’; BMC]
AX-FANTASY for alto saxophone solo & symphonic band (1998) [10’; BMC]
SAXOPHONIA for alto saxophone & symphonic band (1998) [10’; BMC]
Swiss Rhapsody for symphonic band (1998) [10:30; BMC]
Missouri Overture for symphonic band (1999) [10’; BMC]
Concerto for Bassoon No. 2 for bassoon & wind ensemble (1999) [14:30; Stormworks Europe]
Double Concerto for oboe, bassoon & wind ensemble (2000) [11’; Stormworks Europe]
Magic Oregon for symphonic band (2000) [15’; BMC]
Adagietto for baritone sax & string orchestra (2000) [4’15”; manuscript]
Megkésett hangok for solo flute (2000?) [4’; manuscript]
Te deum for symphonic band, mixed choir, 3 soprano solos & organ (2000) [10’; Stormworks Europe]
Intelmek oratorio for symphonic orchestra, man’s choir, tenor, bass & narrator (2000) [manuscript]
Violina for violin & wind ensemble (2001) [13’; Stormworks Europe]
Piano Concerto No. 1 (arranged for wind band) (2002) [22’; Stormworks]
Black Russian for symphonic band (2002) [5’; Stormworks Europe]
Concerto for Flute No. 3 for flute & string orchestra (2002) [12’; manuscript]
Double Concerto for two flutes & string orchestra (2002) [12’; ?]
Fantasy for symphonic band (2003) [8’; Stormworks]
Fájdalmas könyörgés / Disconsolate Prayer for string orchestra (2004) [7’; manuscript]

References
Biography and list of works from Hungarian Radio (English version available)

1928 births
2007 deaths
20th-century classical composers
Franz Liszt Academy of Music alumni
Hungarian classical composers
Hungarian male classical composers
Hungarian conductors (music)
Male conductors (music)
20th-century conductors (music)
20th-century Hungarian male musicians